Conus cymbioides is a species of sea snail, a marine gastropod mollusk in the family Conidae, the cone snails and their allies.

Like all species within the genus Conus, these snails are predatory and venomous. They are capable of "stinging" humans, therefore live ones should be handled carefully or not at all.

Description
The length of the shell of the holotype attains 24.2 mm.

Distribution
This marine species occurs off Southern Madagascar

References

 Monnier E., Tenorio M.J., Bouchet P. & Puillandre N. (2018). The cones (Gastropoda) from Madagascar "Deep South": composition, endemism and new taxa. Xenophora Taxonomy. 19: 25–75-page(s): 47, pl. 12 figs 1–9

External links

cymbioides
Gastropods described in 2018